Holy Wood or Holywood may refer to:

Places
 Holywood, County Down, a town and townland in Northern Ireland
 Holywood, County Down (civil parish), a civil parish in County Down, Northern Ireland
 Holywood railway station (Northern Ireland)
 Holywood, Dumfries and Galloway, a village and civil parish in south west Scotland
 Holywood railway station (Scotland), a former station

Arts
 Holy Wood (novel), an unpublished novel by Marilyn Manson
 Holy Wood (In the Shadow of the Valley of Death), a 2000 album by Marilyn Manson
 Holy Wood, a fictional location in the 1990 DiscWorld novel Moving Pictures by Terry Pratchett

Other
 Christopher Holywood (1559–1626), 17th-century Jesuit
 Guaiacum sanctum, commonly known as Holywood or Holywood Lignum-vitae

See also

 Palo santo (disambiguation), (Spanish: holy wood)
 
 
 Wood (disambiguation)
 Holy (disambiguation)